Taalam Acey (born September 16, 1970) is an American spoken-word artist. He began pursuing the art in 1997 after visiting a poetry reading upon the invitation of a friend. At that point in his life, Acey was a full-time lecturer in senior level accounting at Rutgers University and a principal partner in a small business consulting firm. In 1999, Acey left Rutgers University to become a full-time performance poet. Each year, he travels to more than 50 cities in the United States and abroad to share his art and perspectives with enthralled audiences.
Much of Acey's poetry addresses social and political issues from an afro-centric perspective while he maintains a fan base of a wide range of ethnicities. His work also provides a poetic perspective of relationships, whether man to woman, mother to son, or man to man. He champions the struggles of single parenthood and fatherly responsibility.

Early years
Born in Newark, New Jersey, Acey spent his childhood immersed in the African-centered political analysis. At the time of his birth, his teenage parents were field soldiers in Amiri Baraka’s Community for a Unified Newark (CUAN). Notably, the year of Acey's birth, CUAN helped Kenneth Gibson become the first black mayor of Newark.

Acey acquired his elementary education at Chad School in Newark. His father had been instrumental in organizing the private school, which employed all African-American staff and administrators. Chad School held high academic expectations of its students. The curriculum was geared to provide a positive sense of self, dispel negative stereotypes about African Americans, and teach the contributions of African Americans in society.

Career highlights
Acey was one of four poets from around the US selected by Essence magazine to feature at the 2001 Essence Music Festival in New Orleans. Previous to that, he was chosen to open up for activist Dick Gregory for a live PBS broadcast from the University of Texas at Austin . Acey was one of five poets from around the United States selected to feature in the New Jersey Performing Arts Center's ground-breaking, "Theater of the Spoken Word". Acey has also lectured on performance poetry for the University of California at Berkeley's Center for Urban Education.

Along with Essence magazine (September 2001), his work has been featured in several publications including Philadelphia Weekly (December 2005), New Jersey Star Ledger (July 2001). Marc Smith the founder of slam poetry used examples of Acey's poetry in Smith's definitive book on slam poetry- The Complete Idiot's Guide to Slam Poetry  (2004). BBC Radio One (London) featured Acey in its documentary on slam poetry (2000).

Acey was a member of the 1999 New York City slam team representing the world famous Nuyorican Cafe [www.nuyorican.org]. He was the 2000 Grand Slam Champion of London's Paddington International Poetry Festival. He was also the 2000-2001 New Jersey Slam master and the District of Columbia's Black Words Grand Slam Champion.

His first spoken-word video "When the Smoke Clearz" was shown in film festivals in Los Angeles, New York, Amsterdam and Rotterdam. The video was one of only 22 films nominated for a 2002 Sundance Film Festival On-line Award.

He has won poetry slams and performed his poetry extensively throughout the continental United States, from Los Angeles to Amsterdam as well as in Mexico, Canada, Germany, UK, Jamaica, and the Netherlands. Acey also makes time to perform for non-profit organizations such as shelters that serve as a lifeline to people at tenuous points in their lives. In 2004, Acey worked with Project Stay Free , an at-risk youth program in Delaware (2008) designed to “educate and liberate youth from the juvenile justice system".

Along with 13 spoken-word CDs, Acey has published an award-winning memoir, a novel, a comprehensive compilation of his poetry and, most recently, a book entitled Excellent Exposure (2009). Acey describes his latest effort as, "A defiantly open compendium of essays and poems derived from over a decade of success as a full-time world traveling poet. This self expository collection weaves critical thought, blunt introspection and empirical enlightenment."

Published works

Literary
Excellent Exposure, essays and poems, Word Supremacy Press, 2009 
Troubled Soul Refinery, poetry compilation, Word Supremacy Press, 2007 
What You Deserve, a novel, Word Supremacy Press, 2006 
Eyes Free: The Memoir, Word Supremacy Press, 2003

Recorded performances/CD
The Market 4 Change, Volume 2 (2009) 
California Suite (2008) 
Self Construct (2007) 
The Market 4 Change (2007) 
Underground Heavy (2006) 
Pieces of Change Disc 2 (2005) 
Pieces of Change Disc 1 (2005) 
Belief System (2003) 
Blues Resurgence (2002) 
Code Blues (2001) 
Morally Bankrupt Final: Mood Demystify (2000) 
Morally Bankrupt Two: Pain Remover (2000) 
Morally Bankrupt One: The Wickedest Man in Babylon (1999)

References

External links
 Taalam Acey's Official Website
 Taalam Acey at Reverbnation.com

1970 births
21st-century American poets
African-American poets
American spoken word artists
Copyright activists
Living people
Artists from Newark, New Jersey
Poets from New Jersey
Rutgers University alumni
Slam poets
Writers from Newark, New Jersey
21st-century African-American writers
20th-century African-American people